Kodi Rammurthy Naidu (1882/83–1942), also known as Kodi Rama Murthy Naidu, and Prof. Rammurty was an Indian bodybuilder, strongman, and wrestler. He was awarded the title of Indian Hercules by King George V. He is also known by the epithets Kaliyuga Bhima, Indian Sandow, Malla Marthanda. He established a circus and earned a lot of money but donated it to the charitable trusts contributed a lot in the Indian independence movement.

Rammurty worked as Physical Education Teacher in the Branch College of Vizianagaram. He got profound knowledge in Vayu Stambhana (en. air resistance) and Jala Stambhana (en.water resistance).

Early life
Rammurty Naidu was born to Kodi Venkanna Naidu in the village of Veeraghattam in Srikakulam district (now in Parvathipuram Manyam district of Andhra Pradesh). The Hindu notes his birth date as April 1882, while Sakshi gave the  birth date as 3 November 1883.

His mother died when he was a child. Since the boy had become motherless, his father treated him with more care and affection in his childhood. As he grew up he started quarrelling with his age group youngsters the father Venkanna sent him to Vizianagaram for his studies where he lived with his uncle who was serving there as an Inspector of Police.

Career

Joining the fitness centre 

Rammurthy joined a fitness centre in Vizianagaram and learnt kusthi, a type of wrestling. His uncle Kodi Narayana Swamy, sent him to another fitness centre in Madras. He returned to Vizianagaram after one-year training and joined as a physical training instructor at a college of the state. He was a strict vegetarian and the Andhra Pradesh government devoted a chapter in the Telugu text books about the prominence of gaining strength purely based on plant based protein.

First body show
In 1911 he went to Madras and showed his skills of breaking steel chains, stopping motor cars and allowing elephant to pass over his chest before the public and government authorities. He was awarded there the title of Indian Sandow for his excellence.

Established a circus company 
He established a circus company at Vizianagaram with the help of his friend, Potti Panthulu. His uncommon feats attracted people from all over the country. He used to break an iron chain tied to his body by taking a deep breath and flexing his muscles. Iron chains would be tied to his shoulders and the other ends were tied to two cars and used to stop them. He took an elephant on his chest and held it for five minutes.

Impressed the lord
Then the Viceroy of British India, Lord Minto, experienced Ramamurthy's strength, when he tried to drive his car with Rammurthy holding it back with iron chains. His fame spread across the length and breadth of the country after this incident.

Demonstrating his physical strength 
He demonstrated his skills at the Indian National Congress meeting in Allahabad. Pandit Madan Mohan Malaviya encouraged him to perform his feats abroad and sent his team to London.

Honored by the crown
King George and Queen Mary were impressed with his feats and gave him the title Indian Hercules after watching his display of physical strength at Buckingham Palace.

Kaliyuga Bhima
He was the first Indian to be so honoured by the royal couple. When he put before them the historical facts of Bhima of Mahabharata and compared it with those of Greek Hercules and Prussian Sandow, the King awarded him another more prestigious title of Kaliyuga Bhima to him.

Performances abroad 
This great bodybuilder performed impressive feats like stopping two cars(driving on two different directions) of 25 horse power at high acceleration, breaking iron chains (of half inches) and holding an elephant leg on his chest, as well as juggling elephant babies  with weights attached to them. He also performed in France, Germany, Japan and Spain.

Bullfighting in Spain
When he was in Spain the Spanish people invited him to fight the bull at ring. He entered the bullfighting ring, caught hold on a bull by its horns and threw it to the ground. Although he had no experience of fighting such bulls yet he dared to do and performed it successfully.

Contribution to charity and freedom movement 

Ramamurthy was attracted towards the freedom movement through B. Chandrayya Naidu, who used to organise tribal youths against the British rulers. He earned crores of rupees through his circus company but spent a large amount of his wealth on charity and for the Freedom movement of India.

Legacy
A statue of him is erected on the Beach Road of Visakhapatnam. Another statue is also situated in his home town Veeraghattam and also in his home district of Srikakulam. Kodi Rammurthy Stadium has been named after him.

References

External links
The Hindu
Dr. Sridevi S. Kody Rammoorthy : Luminaries of Andhra Pradesh 1976 Andhra Pradesh Sahitya Academi Hyderabad.

Indian wrestlers
Telugu people
Naidu, Kodi Ramamurthy
Naidu, Kodi Ramamurthy
Indian bodybuilders
Sportspeople from British India
People associated with physical culture
People from Srikakulam district
19th-century Indian sportspeople
People from Uttarandhra